is a planned, but as-yet unbuilt, rapid transit line that would run from Suminoekōen in Suminoe-ku to Kire-Uriwari in Hirano-ku within the city of Osaka. While no timetable has been announced for its construction, it has the provisional name .

Overview 
Of the nine planned subway lines in Osaka subway, this is the only one that has not yet started any construction. If it is constructed as planned, it would be the only other subway line apart from the Imazatosuji Line to pass completely outside the Osaka Loop Line.

Line 9's planned route is in the southern part of Osaka city (specifically, Suminoe-ku, Sumiyoshi-ku, Higashisumiyoshi-ku, and Hirano-ku). Despite the high volume of road traffic, it has relatively inconvenient east-west mass transit compared to other parts of Osaka: most buses divert from the route at Sentai or Nagai, requiring several transfers to go any significant distance. As a result, the construction of this line has long been the hope of area residents.

Apart from its planned route (under Nagaikōen-dōri) and connecting stations already existing (or planned) on other lines, relatively little is set in stone. An automated guideway transit system (effectively an extension of the Nankō Port Town Line) was initially suggested, but space considerations mean that the line, if built, will likely be a more traditional underground railway utilizing narrow cross-section, linear motor-powered trains like those on the Nagahori Tsurumi-ryokuchi Line and Imazatosuji Line.

Construction prospects 

With both Osaka and its Municipal Transportation Bureau being in the middle of a very tight financial situation, the planned southern extension of the Imazatosuji Line has been postponed indefinitely; under these conditions, it seems unlikely that another line passing completely outside the city center, without any major passenger draw along its route, and with little foreseeable demand outside of morning and evening rush hour, will stand much chance of completion in the near-term. Even in the planning stages, it was not anticipated to become profitable. Because of these factors, it has only been planned in broad strokes, and debate about its finer details has yet to occur. Furthermore, as the Municipal Transportation Bureau was privatized in 2017, it is possible that its ultimate fate will be decided by Osaka Rapid Electric Tramway, K.K. (known as Osaka Metro).

Planned connections 

Suminoekōen: Yotsubashi Line, Nankō Port Town Line
Nagai: Midōsuji Line, JR Hanwa Line
Yuzato Rokuchōme (tentative name): Imazatosuji Line (planned extension)
Kire-Uriwari: Tanimachi Line

The line would also pass under the Nankai Main Line, Hankai Tramway Hankai Line, Nankai Kōya Line, and Kintetsu Minami Osaka Line, but these lines do not have a station adjoining the route along Nagaikōen-dōri.

External links 
Osaka City Subway – planned lines

Transport in Osaka Prefecture
Proposed railway lines in Japan